The husband stitch or husband's stitch, also known as the daddy stitch, husband's knot  and vaginal tuck, is a surgical procedure in which one or more additional sutures than necessary are used to repair a woman's perineum after it has been torn or cut during childbirth. The claimed purpose is to tighten the opening of the vagina and thereby enhance the pleasure of her male sex partner during penetrative intercourse. The Husband stitch was for long considered an urban legend, but since then, numerous reports have interviewed witnesses, both patients and doctors.

Medical perspective
While repair of the perineum may be medically necessary, an extra stitch is not, and may cause discomfort or pain. Use of the term in the medical literature can be traced to Transactions of the Texas State Medical Association in 1885, where a doctor claimed to have performed one."Dr. Geo. Cupples was called upon to explain the 'Husband Stitch,' which he did as follows: He said that when he was stitching up a ruptured perineum, of a married lady, the husband was an anxious and interested observer, and when he had taken all the stitches necessary, the husband peeped over his shoulders and said, 'Dr., can't you take another stitch?' and he did, and called it the 'Husband Stitch'."The term is also referenced in What Women Want to Know (1958), and in The Year After Childbirth: Surviving and Enjoying the First Year of Motherhood, written by Sheila Kitzinger in 1994. 

Few studies exist to determine whether the procedure occurs often and how many women have been affected beyond anecdotal evidence. Some medical practitioners have asserted that the procedure is mostly an urban legend, and false attribution, while others have claimed to know doctors who perform the procedure. The American Congress of Obstetricians and Gynecologists, according to a report by Fatherly, does not deny that the procedure happens, while alleging that it “is not standard or common.” Other doctors, such as Jean Marty, head of the Union of Gynecologysts in France, have claimed that the idea of a Husband Stitch comes from botched episiotomies and poor stitching, that lead women to have pain during sexual intercourse and while urinating. Episiotomies have become a routine procedure around the world, in spite of studies that claimed it offers no benefits to pregnant people.

However, there are several accounts of women who claim to have undergone this procedure without their consent. There have been several journalistic investigations on the existence of the Husband Stitch, trying to determine if it was real. They have overwhelmingly determined that the practice does exist, as seen in reports by Chelsea Ritschel, writing for Healthline, by Kaitlin Reilly for Yahoo Life, by Anam Alam to Thred, in reports from French Newspapers Grazia, and Le Monde.

Belgian researchers Julie Dobbeleir, Koenraad Van Landuyt and Stan J. Monstrey have studied the practice, finding evidence of it happening in Belgium at least since the 50s:Vaginal tightening surgery has been around since the mid fifties, where gynecologists used to tighten the entrance of a woman’s vagina with an extra stitch while repairing vaginal and  perineum tears or episiotomies after giving birth. At that time it was notoriously known as the ‘‘husband’s stitch,’’ the ‘‘husband’s knot,’’ or the ‘‘vaginal tuck,’’ and doctors discreetly referred to this procedure as ‘‘improving a woman’s well-being.’’The Husband Stitch has also been referenced in a 2004 study about the abuse of episiotomies in Sao Paulo:Professionals we have interviewed often mention the ponto do marido (husband’s stitch), intended to make the vaginal opening even tighter after delivery. Frequent complications are vulval and vaginal pain, scarring problems and deformities that need further surgical correction. Long-term consequences for sexual relations of episiotomy need further study.Similarly in Cambodia, the practice has been linked to high rates of episiotomy: "A study in the NIH database found that the continued use of episiotomies in Cambodia was due to many doctors’ belief that they would provide women with a “tighter and prettier vagina” if they gave her an episiotomy."

OBGYN Jesanna Cooper, MD has also pointed out the risks to vaginal health connected with the procedure, and the lack of benefits: "A ‘husband stitch’ would not affect overall vaginal tone, as this has much more to do with pelvic floor strength and integrity than with introitus [opening] size". A report on Fatherly also warned men not to see it as a joke: "Best case scenario, the person delivering your kid is going to think you don’t know how sex works. Worst case scenario, it backfires with a pointless stitch that could cause your partner more pain. Even if it’s coming from a good place, the best way to reduce the risk of someone not getting a joke is to stop telling it."

Popular culture
A short story by Carmen Maria Machado, "The Husband Stitch", first published in 2014 by Granta and later published in the collection Her Body and Other Parties, describes a woman undergoing the procedure.

In Doom Patrols season 2 2020 premiere Cliff's father tells him, "When that baby doctor asks if you want the husband stitch, you tell him, "I'll take two."

In Colin From Accounts 2022 season 1 episode 4 a patient's male companion asks the protagonist student doctor to "throw another stitch in there, make it like new" and later on a different patient's male companion asks her to "chuck a husband stitch in there".

Notes

References

Bibliography 
Braun, Virginia, and Celia Kitzinger. “The Perfectible Vagina: Size Matters.” Culture, Health &amp; Sexuality, vol. 3, no. 3, 2001, pp. 263–277., https://doi.org/10.1080/13691050152484704. 

Dobbeleir, Julie M.L.C.L., et al. “Aesthetic Surgery of the Female Genitalia.” Seminars in Plastic Surgery, vol. 25, no. 02, 2011, pp. 130–141., https://doi.org/10.1055/s-0031-1281482. 

Mayra, K., Sandall, J., Matthews, Z. et al. Breaking the silence about obstetric violence: Body mapping women’s narratives of respect, disrespect and abuse during childbirth in Bihar, India. BMC Pregnancy Childbirth 22, 318 (2022). https://doi.org/10.1186/s12884-022-04503-7

Simone G Diniz, Alessandra S Chacham, “The Cut Above” and “the Cut Below”: The Abuse of Caesareans and Episiotomy in São Paulo, Brazil, Reproductive Health Matters, Volume 12, Issue 23, 2004, Pages 100-110, ISSN 0968-8080, https://doi.org/10.1016/S0968-8080(04)23112-3.

Zaami S, Stark M, Beck R, Malvasi A, Marinelli E. Does episiotomy always equate violence in obstetrics? Routine and selective episiotomy in obstetric practice and legal questions. Eur Rev Med Pharmacol Sci. 2019 Mar;23(5):1847-1854. doi: 10.26355/eurrev_201903_17219. PMID: 30915726.

External links

Childbirth
Women's health
Women's rights